Bácsbokod is a large village and municipality in Bács-Kiskun County, in the Southern Great Plain region of southern Hungary. The Danube River (River Duna) flows 20 kilometers to the west of the village.

At the end of the 19th century and the beginning of the 20th century, Jews lived in Bácsbokod. In 1910, 29 Jews lived in Bácsbokod, Some of them were murdered in the Holocaust.

Geography

Demography
Existing ethnicities:
  Magyars - 97%
  Germans - 2%
  Croats - 0.68%
 Serbs, Romani, Bunjevci other - 0.32%

References

External links

  in Hungarian

Populated places in Bács-Kiskun County
Hungarian German communities
Jewish communities destroyed in the Holocaust